Jim Spain (17 September 1902 – 19 June 1983) was  a former Australian rules footballer who played with Richmond in the Victorian Football League (VFL).

Notes

External links 
		

1902 births
1983 deaths
Australian rules footballers from Victoria (Australia)
Richmond Football Club players